The Department of Science and Innovation (DST; formerly the Department of Science and Technology) is the South African government department responsible for scientific research, including space programmes. The current Minister is Blade Nzimande.

Much of the department's work is ultimately carried out through various quasi-independent agencies (although still usually government bodies) including: 
 the National Research Foundation (South Africa), which receives a substantial proportion of the DST budget to carry out various research support tasks, including supporting key national research infrastructure ("National Research Facilities"), scientific research grant administration and a student grant scheme;
 the Council for Scientific and Industrial Research, which acts as a quasi-privatised research and development agency with a specific focus on research of application to industry;
 the Technology Innovation Agency, which serves to provide funding to turn innovative research into commercial products;
 the South African National Space Agency, which covers space-related research and development initiatives;
 the Human Sciences Research Council (South Africa), which focuses its research on human health and disease.

References

External links 
 
 SEDS South Africa (Students for the Exploration and Development of Space, South Africa)

 

Science and Innovation
Science and technology in South Africa
South Africa